Janeth Paola Cabezas Castillo (born 4 September 1978) is an Ecuadorian politician and former television presenter. She was the Governor of Esmeraldas Province from 2013 to 2016 and is a current member of Ecuador's National Assembly for the Citizen Revolution Movement (RC). Cabezas was elected leader of the largest political coalition in the 2021 National Assembly, the Union for Hope (UNES).

Early life and education 
Cabezas was born in Esmeraldas on 4 September 1978 and grew up in Quinindé. She started her radio career when she was fifteen. She graduated from the University of Guayaquil in 2008 and then studied Political Marketing at the Universidad del Salvador in Buenos Aires, Argentina, where she graduated with a master's degree.

Professional career 
Cabezas worked as a radio presenter for a variety of radio stations of Esmeraldas, Quito and Guayaquil including Radio Disney of Guayaquil. In 2007 she was seen on TV as the presenter of RTS's morning TV program. This ceased in 2009 when she was the first Afro-Ecuadorian news anchor for Ecuador TV. In 2010, she entered public administration, where she was employed in several positions until 2013.

Political career 
In 2013, Cabezas was appointed as the Governor of the northern province of Esmeraldas by Ecuador's then President Rafael Correa. She was succeeded as Governor in 2016 by the President's next appointee who was Gabriel Rivera López. 

After her resignation as Governor, she put pressure on the President to ensure that she was appointed to the committee overseeing the recovery from the 2016 Ecuador earthquake. Her region was one of the two most affected, and she became the only representative on the committee from Esmeraldas province in October 2016. In the parliamentary elections of 2017, she was elected a substitute MP for Augusto Espinosa in the National Assembly. In the parliamentary elections of 2021, she was elected as an MP through the political alliance Union for Hope (UNES). In May 2021 and after Sofía Espín's resignation from this position, Cabezas was elected as the new leader of this significant political coalition in the National Assembly, the UNES.

In 2022 Cabezas was the opposition leader in the National Assembly where she claimed that the President's introduction of special emergency measures to control dissent in the three provinces of Cotopaxi, Imbabura and Pichincha had "serious irregularities". The measures introduced in June included restricting access to the internet and the "lethal use of force". Debates were held to try and repeal the President's decree. The protests had started with indigenous people protesting about the economic climate but it soon attracted students and workers in support.

Personal life 
In April 2022, Andrés Castillo, candidate for mayor of Quito, published a tweet containing a doctored image of Cabezas. Cabezas made an accusation that the tweet was offensive. The offending tweet also contained a racist aspect. The tweet was condemned by the political party RC, of which Cabezas is a member. In Ecuador, it is an offence to discriminate based on gender; fines can be imposed on politicians and they can be removed from office.

Cabezas formerly straightened her afro-textured hair or wore a wig. However, when her niece asked in 2018 if she could get rid of her "ugly", unstraightened hair and have hair like Cabezas's, Cabezas decided from then on to wear her hair unstraightened.

Cabezas has six younger siblings.

References

1978 births
Living people
People from Esmeraldas, Ecuador
Members of the National Assembly (Ecuador)
Women members of the National Assembly (Ecuador)
Women governors of provinces of Ecuador
Provincial Prefects of Ecuador
21st-century Ecuadorian politicians
21st-century Ecuadorian women politicians
Ecuadorian women television presenters